Bicyclus smithi, or Smith's bush brown, is a butterfly in the family Nymphalidae. It is found in Nigeria, Cameroon, Equatorial Guinea, Angola, the Democratic Republic of the Congo, Uganda, Kenya and Tanzania. The habitat consists of lowland forests.

Adults are attracted to fermenting bananas.

Subspecies
Bicyclus smithi smithi (Nigeria, Cameroon, Angola, Democratic Republic of the Congo, Uganda, western Kenya, western Tanzania)
Bicyclus smithi eurypterus Condamin, 1965 (Democratic Republic of the Congo)
Bicyclus smithi fernandina (Schultze, 1914) (Bioko)

References

Elymniini
Butterflies described in 1899
Butterflies of Africa
Taxa named by Per Olof Christopher Aurivillius